Rainbow Routes Association (RRA) is an incorporated, not-for-profit organization and registered charity.  The organization is dedicated to sustainable mobility through the development and promotion of active transportation routes in the city of Greater Sudbury, Ontario, Canada, and is the local representative for the Trans Canada Trail.

Incorporated in 1998, Rainbow Routes has built recreational and commuter routes—200 kilometres winding throughout the city—for residents and tourists to enjoy by walking, hiking, jogging, cycling, in-line skating, skateboarding, cross-country skiing, or snowshoeing. They provide free trail maps that are available throughout Greater Sudbury at tourist information centres, libraries and at their website.

This organization maintains a legal agreement with the city to build non-motorized trails, renewable every five years.

The 2016-2020 Strategic Plan for the organization identifies high level priorities in:
Infrastructure development of non-motorized routes and trails;
Promotion of routes, active transportation and sustainable mobility;
Partnerships and collaborations to identify needs and maximize opportunities;
Sustainable operations with a strong volunteer network.

Accomplishments

Trail Construction
Recent:
 construction of the Riverside Pocket Park 
 refurbishment of the Lily Creek Boardwalk 
 completion of the Ramsey Lake Path (2 km paved path)

From June 24, 2005 to June 25, 2009; Rainbow Routes accomplished the following:

 construction of Bell Park bike path 
 upgrading of Voyageur trail to a four-season trail (5 km)
 construction of Kelly Lake trail (5 km)
 construction of the Garson Park trail (2 km)
 construction of Selkirk trail extension (2 km)
 construction of the Bethel Lake boardwalk
 completion of Bethel Lake trail (2 km)
 completion of Sagebrush to Maley Drive section of the Junction Creek Waterway Park (1 km)
 development of the Copper Cliff trail (2 km)
 construction of Langdon Park trail (1 km)
 development of the Robinson Lake trail/boardwalk (completion in 2009)

Programs

Explore Sudbury 
Explore Sudbury is the RRA's latest initiative towards healthy living and Greater Sudbury's urban transformation.  Started in January 2017, the volunteer-driven program offers guided urban hikes of all sorts, geared to participants of all ages in the City of Greater Sudbury.  All urban hikes are free of charge and promoted as a way to discover Sudbury's people and places.

Rainbow Routes Hike Club 
The Rainbow Routes Hike Club was formed to provide an opportunity for people to explore local routes in a safe, friendly environment.  Hikes are generally two hours long and range in difficulty from easy to challenging.  Each month a new trail is selected in order to provide a sampling of the trails in the City.  Hikes run on the first Saturday of each month between October and June from 10am to noon.

Sudbury Cycles Project
The goal of this project is to establish the conditions necessary to make cycling safe for and accessible to Greater Sudburians of all ages, abilities and incomes thus creating a more active and healthy community with fewer cycling injuries.

The project was made possible through funding from the Ontario Ministry of Health Promotion and partnerships with the Sudbury & District Health Unit, City of Greater Sudbury and the Social Planning Council of Sudbury .

Sustainable Mobility Plan
In 2010, the organization took the lead on the development of a Sustainable Mobility Plan for the city of Greater Sudbury which emphasizes the importance of walking and cycling for the purpose of personal transportation and not just for leisure. In response to a request from the City of Greater Sudbury Healthy Community Cabinet, a partnership was formed between City staff the Sudbury & District Health Unit, The greater Sudbury Social Planning Council, YMCA Sudbury the Sudbury Regional Hospital and Rainbow Routes Association. Through this partnership, funding was secured from the Ontario Ministry of Health Promotion to develop a Sustainable Mobility Plan for Greater Sudbury.

The concept of sustainable mobility refers to the ability of individuals to move freely within
their communities, and it generally refers to non-motorized modes of transportation. The
Sustainable Mobility Plan (SMP) for the City of Greater Sudbury is anticipated to move the
community forward in terms of active transportation strategies and initiatives. With a focus on
low income populations the plan will examine the mobility of individuals and the impact
mobility has on our health, our environment, and our economy.

Learning through Trails
From 2007, Rainbow Routes Association developed the Learning through Trails program which is an innovative program that integrates the Ontario Ministry of Education elementary curriculum with the physical activity of a trail walk. Close to 2700 students and hundreds of educators and volunteers have participated in the program since its inception.  Survey responses indicate that over 96% of students enjoyed their experience and 93% would recommend it to other classes.  100% of educators indicated that they had a positive experience and would recommend the program to their colleagues.

References

External links 
 
 Sustainable Mobility Plan for the City of Greater Sudbury

Organizations based in Greater Sudbury
Sustainable transport